is a Japanese manga artist and humorist. Eiji writes and illustrates shōnen and seinen manga. His work appears in several manga magazines published by Kodansha.

His most popular serial, Cromartie High School, ran in Weekly Shōnen Magazine from 2001 to 2006. The serial won Eiji the 2002 Kodansha Manga Award in the shōnen category.  In 2003, it was a jury selection in the seventh annual Japan Media Arts Festival. That same year, an animated series based on the serial premiered on TV Tokyo. A live-action feature film, called Cromartie High – The Movie, followed in 2005. A spin-off sequel titled Cromartie Kōkō Shokuinshitsu ("Cromartie High School Staff Room") debuted on October 27th 2018 on Kodansha's Magazine Pocket app. Nonaka authored the manga while the art was drawn by Ino Ichiban.

Kodansha republished the serial in 17 paperback volumes (tankōbon). From 2001 through 2006, they released two or three volumes per year as the story progressed. ADV Manga published English translations of the first 12 volumes in 2005–2007; the first four of these were nominated for a 2006 Eisner Award in the category "Best U.S. Edition of Foreign Material".

Double-J was adapted into an animated miniseries, which aired on Nippon TV in 2011.

Manga series

Shōnen
 Super Baseball Club (1991)
  [2000]
  [2004]
  [2006]
  [2009]
  [2010]
  [2018]

Seinen
  [1996]
  [1998]
  [2000]
  [2001]
  [2007]
  [2008]

See also
 Ryoichi Ikegami

References

Further reading

External links
 
 

1965 births
Living people
20th-century Japanese artists
21st-century Japanese artists
Japanese cartoonists
Manga writers
Manga artists from Tokyo
Winner of Kodansha Manga Award (Shōnen)